Argowal is a village in Hoshiarpur district, Punjab, India.

References

Villages in Hoshiarpur district